Margaret Anne "Peggy" Staggers (born January 12, 1945) was a Democratic member of the West Virginia House of Delegates and served as an Assistant Majority Whip. Staggers is an emergency physician.

Early life and education 
Staggers was born on January 12, 1945, at Naval Air Station Patuxent River in St. Mary's County, Maryland and was the eldest child and daughter of Harley Orrin Staggers, Sr. (August 3, 1907 – August 20, 1991) and his wife Mary Casey Staggers. At the time of her birth, Staggers' father was serving as a lieutenant commander in the United States Naval Air Corps in both the European and Pacific theaters during World War II. In 1948, Staggers' father was elected a member of the United States House of Representatives from West Virginia's 2nd congressional district where he served until 1981.

Staggers earned her M.D. in 1969 from the West Virginia University School of Medicine after which she completed her residency in emergency medicine.

Medical career 
Staggers is an emergency room physician practicing at Beckley Appalachian Regional Hospital in Beckley, West Virginia. In addition to her emergency medicine practice, Staggers serves as the medical director of multiple emergency medical services and emergency operations centers in Fayette, Wyoming, Raleigh, and Boone counties in West Virginia.

Staggers briefly considered retiring from emergency medicine at Beckley Appalachian Regional Hospital following a July 7, 2011, incident in which an elderly female patient attacked Staggers as she attempted to provide aid to the woman. The elderly patient scratched Staggers' face, drawing blood. Staggers returned to her legislative duties in Charleston the week after the attack.

Political activities 
In 1978, Staggers served as a delegate to the 1976 Democratic National Convention at Madison Square Garden in New York City where she voted to nominate United States Senator Robert Byrd as the Democratic candidate for the 1976 United States presidential election.

West Virginia House of Delegates tenure
Staggers was elected to the West Virginia House of Delegates from the 29th district representing Fayette County, West Virginia, in 2006. She served at various points as an Assistant Majority Whip, vice-chairperson on the Roads and Transportation Committee, and a member of the Government Organization Committee, Health and Human Resources Committee, Veterans Affairs/Homeland Security Committee, and the House Select Committee on Redistricting. During the 79th session of the West Virginia Legislature, Staggers served as vice-chairperson of the Committee on Enrolled Bills.

In 2008, Staggers authored legislation extending a tax break to volunteer firefighters excusing them from tax that are due beyond what is already withheld from paychecks.

On the 30th anniversary of the passage of the Staggers Rail Act of 1980 authored by her father, Congressman Harley Orrin Staggers, Sr., Staggers wrote an editorial in the Charleston Gazette-Mail praising the bipartisan effort in the United States Congress led by her father to deregulate the United States railroad industry.

Affiliations 
Staggers is a former president of the West Virginia Chapter of the American College of Emergency Physicians, past chairman and member of the West Virginia Chapter of the American Heart Association, and a fellow of the American College of Emergency Physicians and American Academy of Family Physicians.

References

External links

1945 births
American Academy of Family Physicians members
American medical academics
Educators from West Virginia
American women educators
American emergency physicians
Living people
Democratic Party members of the West Virginia House of Delegates
American healthcare managers
People from Fayetteville, West Virginia
People from Keyser, West Virginia
People from St. Mary's County, Maryland
Physicians from West Virginia
Staggers family of West Virginia
West Virginia University School of Medicine alumni
Women state legislators in West Virginia
21st-century American politicians
21st-century American women politicians
20th-century American physicians
20th-century American women physicians
21st-century American physicians
21st-century American women physicians